Chaka reigned as tsar of Bulgaria from 1299 to 1300. He was the son of the Mongol leader Nogai Khan by a wife named Alaka. Sometime after 1285 Chaka married a daughter of George Terter I of Bulgaria, named Elena. In the late 1290s, Chaka supported his father Nogai in a war against the legitimate khan of the Golden Horde, Toqta. Toqta defeated and killed Nogai in 1299.

Chaka had led his supporters into Bulgaria, intimidated the regency for Ivan II into fleeing the capital, and imposed himself as ruler in Tărnovo in 1299. It is not completely certain whether he reigned as Emperor of Bulgaria or simply acted as the overlord of his brother-in-law Theodore Svetoslav. He is accepted as a ruler of Bulgaria by Bulgarian historiography.

Chaka did not long enjoy his new position of power, as the armies of Toqta followed him into Bulgaria and besieged Tărnovo. Theodore Svetoslav, who had been instrumental in Chaka's seizure of power, organized a plot in which Chaka was deposed and strangled in prison in 1300. His head was sent to Toqta, which in turn secured Theodore Svetoslav's position as the new emperor of Bulgaria. It seems that Theodore Svetoslav's cooperation contributed to the withdrawal of Mongol interference in Bulgaria.

Family
It is not known if Chaka had children from Elena, the daughter of George I of Bulgaria. He had at least one son, Kara Küçük, likely from a concubine. Kara Küçük led a fragment of the Nogai Horde until sometime after 1301. After the death of Chaka, Kara Küçük fled the Horde with 3000 Tatar horsemen and 
offered to take service with Shishman of Vidin.

References
 John V.A. Fine, Jr., The Late Medieval Balkans, Ann Arbor, 1987.

External links

13th-century births
1300 deaths
13th-century Bulgarian emperors
Murdered Bulgarian monarchs
13th-century Mongol rulers